Michael Hicks Beach or Michael Hicks-Beach may refer to:

Michael Hicks-Beach (1760–1830), MP for Cirencester, 1794–1818
Sir Michael Hicks Beach, 8th Baronet (1809–1854), MP for East Gloucestershire 1854 
Michael Hicks Beach, 1st Earl St Aldwyn (1837–1916), 9th Baronet, Chancellor of the Exchequer 1885–1886 & 1895–1902, Conservative leader in the House of Commons 1885–1886
Michael Hicks Beach, Viscount Quenington (1877–1916), British politician
Michael Hicks Beach, 2nd Earl St Aldwyn (1912–1992)
Michael Henry Hicks Beach, 3rd Earl St Aldwyn (born 1950)

See also 
Hicks Beach Baronets